Nextgen, Next Gen, or NextGen may refer to:

Arts and media
 Age of X-Man: NextGen, a 2019 comic book, part of the Age of X-Man crossover
 Next Gen (film), a 2018 computer-animated sci-fi action film distributed by Netflix
 Next Generation (magazine), a defunct video game magazine
 Star Trek: The Next Generation, a television show

Companies 
NextGen Healthcare, a software company that develops systems for the healthcare industry
Nextgen Networks, a communication company in Australia
NexGen, a defunct semiconductor company

Technology
 Next Generation Air Transportation System, the United States Federal Aviation Administration's massive overhaul of the US airspace system
 Next Gen TV, a marketing term for the ATSC 3.0 set of television broadcast standards

Other uses
Juventus Next Gen, reserve football team of Juventus F.C.
 NextGen America, an organization focused on climate change, founded by Tom Steyer
 NextGen series, a European football club cup competition for under-19 footballers
 Next Gen (NASCAR), the seventh-generation stock car set to be used in the NASCAR Cup Series from 2022
 Next Generation ATP Finals, a youth tennis tournament

See also 
 Generation Next (disambiguation)
 Next Generation (disambiguation)